Gary Conn is an American retired ice hockey center who was an All-American for Maine.

Career
Conn was a member of Maine's first recruiting class when the ice hockey program was revived in 1977. The Black Bears started out in Division II and saw some success with Conn as leading scorer in his freshman season. The next season, Maine finished in the top three in their 16-team division and made the postseason. Conn again led the team in scoring, this time with 65 points, and was named to the All-Conference team. Maine received the top seed in the ECAC 2 Tournament and won their first playoff game but were upset in the semifinals.

After their 25-win season, the program was promoted to Division I and jumped straight into ECAC Hockey. Conn led the team in scoring for the third consecutive year, though with 20 fewer points and the Black Bears finished with a losing record. Just as they had in D-II, Maine won over 20 games in their second year and made the postseason. Conn led all Black Bear scorers once again and was named an All-American. Conn's was inducted into the Maine Athletic Hall of Fame in 1989.

After graduating, Conn spent time with five different professional teams over two seasons in the new Atlantic Coast Hockey League. He retired after the 1983 season.

Statistics

Regular season and playoffs

Awards and honors

References

External links

1959 births
Living people
Ice hockey players from Massachusetts
Sportspeople from Salem, Massachusetts
American ice hockey centers
AHCA Division I men's ice hockey All-Americans
Maine Black Bears men's ice hockey players
Baltimore Skipjacks players
Erie Golden Blades players
Salem Raiders players